Atlas Service Corps ("Atlas Corps") is a United States-based 501(c)(3) nonprofit organization which aims to facilitate communication among international leaders in the international non-profit sector.  It was founded by  Scott Beale, and formally incorporated on April 7, 2006.

Program
Atlas Corps provides fellowships to rising nonprofit leaders from around the world to volunteer overseas for 12–18 months network and develop skills by working at U.S. nonprofits.  Afterwards, the fellows return to their home countries to work on programs relating to their fellowships. Atlas Corps fellows come from 155 countries, with the first fellows arriving in the U.S. in 2007.

The Brookings Institution drew parallels with Atlas Corps and a "reverse" Peace Corps, as Harris Wofford originally planned to have volunteers from developing countries work in the U.S. during the formation of the Corps, although that was stopped by resistance from the U.S. Government. The Brooking Institute lists Atlas as a private sector example of that concept.

Atlas Corps Fellows
 Vithika Yadav (2007)
 Eyitayo Ogunmola (2015)
 Olumide Idowu (2020)

References

External links

Charities based in Washington, D.C.
Organizations established in 2006
2006 establishments in the United States